Annepona is a genus of sea snails, marine gastropod mollusks in the family Cypraeidae, the cowries.

Species
Species within the genus Annepona include:
Annepona mariae (Schilder, 1927)

References

External links
 

Cypraeidae